The World Should Know is a studio album by the Jamaican reggae singer Burning Spear, released in 1993. It was nominated for a Grammy Award for Best Reggae Album at the 36th Grammy Awards in 1994. Burning Spear supported the album with a North American tour.

Production
The album was produced by Winston Rodney and Nelson Miller.

Critical reception

Newsday noted that "the roots of Spear's heavily rhythmic and deeply spiritual music lie in the insistent patterns of Jamaica's Nyabinghi drummers, which Spear's Burning Band translates into solid drumming and playfully ornamental percussion." The Gazette deemed the album "embarrassingly short on substance and originality." The Los Angeles Times wrote: "This consummately crafted collection features taut, muscular riddims, contemporary keyboard swirls and strong, jazzy horn lines behind Spear's inimitable village-elder voice delivering love songs and his perennial theme of personal identity."

Track listing
"The World Should Know"
"In a Time Like Now"
"I Stand Strong"
"Identity"
"It's Not a Crime"
"Mi Gi Dem" (I Give Them)
"Loving Day"
"Sweeter Than Chocolate"
"On the Inside"
"Peace"

Credits
All songs written by Winston Rodney
Published by Burning Spear Publishing
Executive producer - Burning Music Production
Recorded Grove Recording Studio, White River, Ocho Rios.
Recording Engineer:  Barry O'Hare
Assistant Engineer:  Andrew Thomas.
Mixed by Michael Sauvage.
Mixed at Platinum Island Studio, New York.
Assistant:  Mervyn Williams.
Studio Assistant  Axel Niehaus.
Mastered at Northeast Digital by Toby Mountain.

Musicians
Winston Rodney - vocals, percussion
Nelson Miller - drums
Paul Beckford - bass
Lenford Richards - lead guitar, Casio PG 380
Lenval Jarrett - rhythm guitar
Alvin Haughton - percussion
Additional musicians
Robbie Lyn - keyboards
Nambo Robinson - trombone
Chico Chin - trumpet
Dean Fraser - saxes
Charles Dickey - trombone
James Smith - trumpet
Mark Wilson - saxophone
Sharon Forrester - harmony
Pam Hall - harmony
Marie "Twiggi" Gittens - harmony

References

Burning Spear albums
1993 albums
Heartbeat Records albums